Roy O'Donnell (12 November 1907 – 5 May 1996) was  a former Australian rules footballer who played with Footscray in the Victorian Football League (VFL).

Notes

External links 
		

1907 births
1996 deaths
Australian rules footballers from Victoria (Australia)
Western Bulldogs players